The Eine Lustspielouvertüre (Comedy Overture) Op. 38  for orchestra is a concert overture by Ferruccio Busoni; it was composed in 1897 and revised in 1904.  The main theme appears at once, played by the strings.  The second subject follows on clarinet.  A new section introduces the development.  In recapitulation the second theme is reworked for the cellos and contrabasses over a timpani pedal point.  The work ends with a lively coda.

Selected recordings
 NDR Symphony Orchestra; Werner Andreas Albert, conductor; CPO Records 999 161-2
 Philharmonia Orchestra; Adrian Boult, conductor; Classical Society CSCD 124
 BBC Philharmonic; Neeme Järvi, conductor; Chandos 10302

References
David Ewen, Encyclopedia of Concert Music.  New York; Hill and Wang, 1959.

1897 compositions
Compositions by Ferruccio Busoni
Concert overtures